Muhammad Takiullah (1926 – 16 November 2017) was a Bangladeshi language movement veteran. He was awarded Ekushey Padak in 2018 by the Government of Bangladesh. He was the fourth son of the Bengali linguist Muhammad Shahidullah.

Career
Takiullah reformed the Bangla calendar Promita Bangla Barshapanji. He was involved with the communist movement since the 1940s. He served as the general secretary of the Dhaka committee of the Communist Party in 1951.

References

1920s births
2017 deaths
Bengali language movement activists
Bangladeshi communists
Recipients of the Ekushey Padak
21st-century Bengalis
20th-century Bengalis